is a Japanese former footballer.

Career statistics

Club

Notes

References

1989 births
Living people
Sportspeople from Hyōgo Prefecture
Association football people from Hyōgo Prefecture
Japanese footballers
Association football defenders
Japan Soccer College players
Albirex Niigata Singapore FC players
Singapore Premier League players
Japanese expatriate sportspeople in Singapore
Expatriate footballers in Singapore